Spring Hill is an unincorporated community in Pike County, Alabama, United States.

References

Unincorporated communities in Pike County, Alabama
Unincorporated communities in Alabama